Sergei Simonov is the name of:

Sergei Simonov (ice hockey) (1992–2016), professional ice hockey player
 Sergei Gavrilovich Simonov (1894–1986), Soviet weapons designer
 Sergei Sergeyevich Simonov (born 1983), Russian footballer